Paleochelco is an extinct genus of lizard, possibly a polyglyphanodontian, found in the Late Cretaceous Bajo de la Carpa Formation in Argentina. It contains a single species, P. occultato.

References 

Squamata
Prehistoric reptile genera